Bruce Langhorne (May 11, 1938 – April 14, 2017) was an American folk musician. He was active in the Greenwich Village folk scene in the 1960s, primarily as a session guitarist for folk albums and performances.

Biography

Early life 
Langhorne was born in Tallahassee, Florida, where his father taught at the Florida Agriculture and Mechanical College for Negroes. From the age of four, he lived with his mother in Spanish Harlem, in New York City. He learned violin, but lost most of three fingers of his right hand as a child when lighting a homemade rocket. He was expelled from Horace Mann Prep School, and later claimed that as a teenager he was involved in a stabbing, following which he lived for two years in Mexico. He started playing guitar at the age of 17, and the loss of his fingers contributed to his distinctive playing style.

Early Career in Greenwich Village 
He began accompanying folk singer Brother John Sellers at clubs in Greenwich Village, soon starting to work with other musicians. Langhorne worked with many of the major performers in the folk revival of the 1950s and 1960s, including The Clancy Brothers & Tommy Makem, Joan Baez, Richie Havens, Carolyn Hester, Judy Collins  Peter LaFarge, Gordon Lightfoot, Hugh Masekela, Odetta, Babatunde Olatunji, Peter, Paul and Mary, Richard and Mimi Fariña, Tom Rush, Steve Gillette, and Buffy Sainte-Marie. He first recorded in 1961, with Carolyn Hester, which is when he met Bob Dylan. He later said of Dylan: "I thought he was a terrible singer and a complete fake, and I thought he didn't play harmonica that well.... I didn't really start to appreciate Bobby as something unique until he started writing." In 1963 he accompanied Dylan on The Freewheelin' Bob Dylan, and in 1965 was one of several guitarists on the album Bringing It All Back Home.

Mr. Tambourine Man 
The title character of Bob Dylan's song "Mr. Tambourine Man" was probably inspired by Langhorne, who used to play a large Turkish frame drum in performances and recordings. The drum, which Langhorne purchased in a music store in Greenwich Village, had small bells attached around its interior, giving it a jingling sound much like a tambourine. Langhorne used the instrument most prominently on recordings by Richard and Mimi Fariña. The drum is now in the collection of the Bob Dylan Center in Tulsa.

Work With Bob Dylan 
In addition to inspiring the title character of "Mr. Tambourine Man", Langhorne played the electric guitar countermelody on the song. His guitar is also prominent on several other songs on Dylan's Bringing It All Back Home album, particularly "Love Minus Zero/No Limit" and "She Belongs to Me"; he also played the lead guitar parts on "Subterranean Homesick Blues", "Outlaw Blues", "Bob Dylan's 115th Dream" and "Maggie's Farm". He also played the guitar for Dylan's television performances of "It's Alright Ma (I'm Only Bleeding)" and "It's All Over Now, Baby Blue" on The Les Crane Show in February 1965, a month after the Bringing It All Back Home sessions. Two years earlier, Langhorne performed on "Corrina, Corrina", on the album The Freewheelin' Bob Dylan, and on the outtake "Mixed-Up Confusion", which was eventually released on Biograph. Years later, Langhorne played on tracks for Dylan's album Pat Garrett and Billy the Kid.

Movie Music Composer 
Langhorne composed the music for the Peter Fonda western film The Hired Hand (1971), which combined sitar, fiddle, and banjo. He also provided the scores for Fonda's 1973 science fiction film Idaho Transfer and his 1976 vigilante movie Fighting Mad (directed by Jonathan Demme). Other films featuring Langhorne's scores include Stay Hungry (1976), Melvin and Howard (1980) and Night Warning (1982).

In 1992, Langhorne founded a hot-sauce company, Brother Bru-Bru's African Hot Sauce. The hot sauce is unique for containing "African spices" and all-natural or organic, no-sodium or low-sodium ingredients.

Bruce suffered a debilitating stroke in 2006, but was able to live at home, surrounded by loved ones, until his death from kidney failure on April 14, 2017, in Venice, California

References

External links

 (a split entry under a misspelling)

Illustrated Bruce Langhorne discography
Bruce Langhorne Interview (part 1 continued)
Bruce Langhorne Interview part 2

1938 births
2017 deaths
Musicians from Tallahassee, Florida
African-American guitarists
American film score composers
American folk guitarists
American male guitarists
American percussionists
American rock guitarists
American session musicians
Fingerstyle guitarists
Guitarists from New York (state)
Lead guitarists
Planet Drum members
Tambourine players
20th-century American guitarists
American male film score composers
20th-century American male musicians
People from East Harlem
Deaths from kidney failure
20th-century African-American musicians
21st-century African-American people